Capital punishment was outlawed in New York after the New York Court of Appeals, the highest court in the state, declared the practice as currently practiced unconstitutional under the state's constitution in 2004. However certain crimes occurring in the state that fall under the jurisdiction of the federal government are subject to the federal death penalty.

In 1972, the U.S. Supreme Court's ruling declared existing capital punishment statutes unconstitutional in Furman v. Georgia, abolishing the practice of capital punishment in the United States. In 1976,  the same court's ruling in Gregg v. Georgia allowed states to reinstate the death penalty. In 1995, Governor George Pataki signed a new statute into law which returned the death penalty in New York by authorizing lethal injection for execution. 

Prior to Furman v. Georgia, New York was the first state to adopt the electric chair as a method of execution, which replaced hanging. The last New York execution during that time had occurred in 1963, when Eddie Lee Mays was electrocuted at Sing Sing prison. There were no executions in New York after the reinstatement of the death penalty before it was abolished again on June 24, 2004, when the state's highest court ruled in People v. LaValle that the state's death penalty statute violated the state constitution. New York has had no valid statute relating to capital punishment since then. 

Subsequent legislative attempts at fixing or replacing the statute have failed, and in July 2008 Governor David Paterson issued an executive order disestablishing New York's death row. Legislative efforts to amend the statute have failed, and death sentences are no longer sought at the state level.

Colonial period and statehood

During various periods from the 1600s onward, New York law prescribed the death penalty for crimes such as sodomy, adultery, counterfeiting, perjury, and attempted rape or murder by slaves. In 1796, New York abolished the death penalty for crimes other than murder and treason, but arson was made a capital crime in 1808.

Temporary abolition
In 1860, the New York Legislature passed a bill which effectively, though unintentionally, abolished capital punishment in the state, by repealing hanging as a method of execution without prescribing  an alternative  method. The bill was signed by Governor Edwin D. Morgan in April 1860. The New York Court of Appeals ruled the statute unconstitutional, in part, as an ex post facto law. Governor Morgan signed legislation to restore the death penalty in 1861, and again in 1862 to fully repeal the earlier statute.

Introduction of the electric chair

In 1886, newly elected New York State governor David B. Hill set up a three-member "New York Commission" to determine a new, more humane system of execution to replace hanging. The commission included the human rights advocate and reformer Elbridge Thomas Gerry, New York lawyer and politician Matthew Hale, and Buffalo dentist and experimenter Alfred P. Southwick. Southwick had been developing an idea since the early 1880s of using electric current as a means of capital punishment after hearing about how relatively painlessly and quickly a drunken man died due to grabbing the energized parts on a generator. Southwick had published this proposal first in 1882 and, being a dentist accustomed to performing procedures on subjects in chairs, used the form of a chair in his designs, which became known as the "electric chair". The commission reviewed ancient and modern forms of execution including lethal injection but finally settled on electrocution in 1888. A bill making electrocution New York State's form of execution passed the legislature and was signed by Governor Hill on June 4, 1888, set to go into effect on January 1, 1889.

The first individual to be executed in the electric chair was William Kemmler, on August 6, 1890. Current was passed through Kemmler for 17 seconds and he was declared dead, but witnesses noticed he was still breathing, and the current was turned back on. From start to finish, the execution took eight minutes. During the execution, blood vessels under the skin ruptured and bled, and some witness reported that Kemmler's body caught on fire.

Statistics

From 1890 to 1963, 695 people were executed in New York. The first was William Kemmler on August 6, 1890, and the last was Eddie Lee Mays on August 15, 1963. Kemmler was the first person in the world known to be executed in an electric chair. Except for four individuals, all of the people executed during this period were convicted of murder. The four exceptions were Joseph Sacoda and Demetrius Gula, who were convicted of kidnapping and executed January 11, 1940, and Julius and Ethel Rosenberg, who were convicted of espionage and executed June 19, 1953.

Famous cases

In 1901, Leon Czolgosz was electrocuted for the assassination of U.S. President William McKinley.

Ruth Snyder was one of the very few women executed at Sing Sing. She was put to death in the electric chair in 1928 for the murder of her husband. Infamously, a photographer from the Chicago Tribune smuggled a small camera into the execution chamber and snapped a picture of Snyder after the executioner pulled the switch; it was the first known photograph of an electric chair execution, and it remains one of the only known photographs of such.

A lesser known but contemporaneously notorious case dates to January 1936, when serial killer Albert Fish was put to death for the cannibal murder of 10-year-old Grace Budd. He was confirmed to have committed at least three murders, but he is suspected of being involved in nine and, prior to his execution, he claimed to have murdered over 100 people. At age 65, Fish was one of the oldest people ever executed at Sing Sing, tied with Michael Rossi, a 65-year-old man who was executed in Sing Sing's electric chair on June 29, 1922. The oldest person to be executed in any New York electric chair was Charles Bonier, who was 75 when he died in Auburn's electric chair on July 31, 1907.

Other notable cases are those of seven members of Mafia hit squad Murder, Inc. between 1941 and 1944, including Louis "Lepke" Buchalter, the only mob boss to ever receive the death penalty after being convicted of murder, and some of his associates, including Emanuel "Mendy" Weiss and Louis Capone, who were executed on March 4, 1944, the same night as Buchalter.

Another notable case was that of the "Lonely Hearts Killers" Raymond Fernandez and Martha Beck, who were convicted of three murders but are believed to have killed as many as 20 women between 1947 and 1949. They were executed together on March 8, 1951.

Arguably the most famous execution in state history (although occurring under federal, and not under New York state law) occurred in June, 1953, when Julius and Ethel Rosenberg were put to death at Sing Sing after their conviction on federal espionage charges for passing secrets of the atomic bomb to the Soviet Union. The Rosenbergs were the only American civilians to be executed for espionage-related activity during the Cold War. Ethel’s conviction and severely botched execution remains controversial as David Greenglass, Ethel’s brother and a key witness for the prosecution, later admitted to giving perjured testimony against Ethel to shield his wife from criminal liability. In 2015, eleven members of the New York City Council declared that "the government wrongfully executed Ethel Rosenberg," and Manhattan Borough President Gale Brewer officially recognized "the injustice suffered by Ethel Rosenberg and her family" and designated September 28 as the "Ethel Rosenberg Day of Justice in the Borough of Manhattan."

Restrictions
In 1965, Governor Nelson Rockefeller, a liberal Republican who supported capital punishment, signed legislation which abolished the death penalty except for cases involving the murder of a police officer.

Furman v. Georgia
In the July 1972 decision in Furman v. Georgia, the U.S. Supreme Court struck down the existing death penalty procedures across the United States. The moratorium lasted until 1976 when the Court ruled in Gregg v. Georgia that states could resume capital punishment under reworked statutes.

Grasso extradition and execution
On January 11, 1995, convicted killer Thomas J. Grasso, who had been sentenced to death by Oklahoma but was serving a sentence of 20 years to life in New York, was extradited from New York to Oklahoma to face execution. Grasso was transported to Buffalo Niagara International Airport and flown to Oklahoma. He was executed on March 20, 1995.

Efforts to reinstate the death penalty
Following the ruling of Gregg v. Georgia, New York was one of the few states that did not immediately return the death penalty following the ruling. There was legislation to return the death penalty as a sanction that passed the Assembly and Senate, but was vetoed by Democratic Governors Hugh Carey and Mario Cuomo.

In the late 1980s, Donald Trump designed an ad calling to bring back the death penalty in New York against the Central Park Five which consists of four black men and one Hispanic male, who were coerced into making false confessions and were wrongly convicted of raping and attempted murder of a white female jogger at Central Park in 1989.

Capital punishment was reinstated in New York in 1995 when Republican Governor George Pataki signed a new statute into law, which provided for execution by lethal injection. However, there were no executions when it was abolished in 2004 after the New York Court of Appeals declared the death penalty to be inadmissible under the constitution of New York.

In 1998, New York State allowed defendants who are guilty of murder that carries a sanction of death to plead guilty in a plea bargain to receive life without parole and avoid the death penalty which could only be imposed after a criminal trial. Critics of this law argue it violates the defendant's fifth amendment right against self-incrimination. In 2001, the New York Court of Appeals declared the law unconstitutional citing that defendants could be coerced by law enforcement into pleading guilty for a murder they did not commit.  

On June 24, 2004, the New York Court of Appeals, the state's highest court, held 4–3 in People v. LaValle that the state's death penalty statute violated the New York Constitution. Governor Pataki criticized the ruling and promised a quick legislative fix.

Between December 2004 and February 2005, public hearings were held in Manhattan and Albany. New York Law School Professor and death penalty advocate Robert Blecker advocated strongly in favor of reinstatement, while Manhattan District Attorney Robert M. Morgenthau strongly opposed reinstatement.

In 2005, Assembly Republicans introduced legislation to revive the death penalty which failed to pass.

In 2007, the New York Court of Appeals heard arguments in People v. John Taylor, and, in rejecting the arguments of the Queens District Attorney, commuted the sentence to life without parole, leaving New York with an empty death row. 

As of 2007, there have been no efforts to return the death penalty.

Political significance in Manhattan District Attorney elections
In the 2005 Democratic primary for Manhattan District Attorney, incumbent Robert Morgenthau's successful campaign produced television advertisements criticizing opponent Leslie Crocker Snyder, a prosecutor who had stated in her autobiography that in one case, she would have been willing to give a lethal injection to a defendant herself, saying Snyder was "Wrong on the Death Penalty, Wrong for Manhattan". The New York Times endorsed Snyder but expressed concern about her support for the death penalty. For the duration of Morgenthau's tenure as Manhattan District Attorney, he never once sought the death penalty in the period it was legal in New York.

In the 2009 Democratic primary in which Morgenthau did not run, Snyder ran for District Attorney again, against Cyrus Vance Jr. (who would win) and Richard Aborn. Both opponents strongly opposed the death penalty, and criticized Snyder for her previous comments. Snyder accused Vance and Aborn of taking her comments out of context, and stated that her position on the death penalty had changed due to learning about wrongful convictions. Aborn said he would oppose attempts to restore it, and would "lead the effort against any attempt to revive it".

Legislative efforts to reinstate the death penalty
In 2005, supporters of the death penalty in the New York Legislature passed a bill restoring New York's death penalty in the Republican-controlled State Senate, but the legislation was voted down by a legislative committee in the Democratic-controlled New York Assembly, and was not enacted into law.

In 2008, the State Senate again passed legislation that would have established the death penalty for the murder of law enforcement officers, but the Assembly did not act on the legislation.

Death row disestablished
In July 2008, Governor David Paterson issued an executive order requiring the disestablishment of death row and the closure of the state's execution chamber at Green Haven Correctional Facility.

Statute repeal effort
Even though the current death penalty statute was ruled unconstitutional and left null and unenforceable by the New York State Court of Appeals in 2004, the death penalty statute was never fully repealed from New York State law. On August 2, 2018, Governor Andrew Cuomo announced that he was advancing legislation to remove the death penalty statute from New York State law.

See also
 List of people executed in New York
 New York State Electrician (executioner)
 Crime in New York
 Law of New York
 Capital punishment in the United States

Further reading

 Philip English Mackey. 1982. Hanging in the Balance: The Anti-Capital Punishment Movement in New York State, 1776–1861. (New York: Garland)

References

External links
 Videos of hearings
 Timeline of New York's death penalty

 
New York
History of New York (state)
New York (state) law